Paragomphus viridior is a species of dragonfly in the family Gomphidae. It is found in Kenya, Sudan, and Uganda. Its natural habitats are subtropical or tropical moist lowland forests and rivers.

References

Gomphidae
Taxonomy articles created by Polbot
Insects described in 1961